Taylor Township is one of the fourteen townships of Union County, Ohio, United States.  The 2010 census found 1,560 people in the township.

Geography
Located in the center of the county, it borders the following townships:
Claibourne Township - northeast
Leesburg Township - east
Paris Township - south
Liberty Township - west
York Township - northwest

No municipalities are located in Taylor Township, although the unincorporated community (hamlet) of Broadway lies in the township's western midsection.

Name and history
It is the only Taylor Township statewide, although there is a Taylor Creek Township in Hardin County.

Taylor was the last township to be organized in Union County, on December 5, 1849.

Government
The township is administered by a three-member Board of Trustees, who are elected in November of odd-numbered years to a four-year term beginning on the following January 1. Two are elected in the year after a presidential election and one is elected in the year before it. There is also a township Fiscal Officer, who is elected in November of the year before a presidential election and serves a four-year term beginning on April 1 of the year after the election.  Trustee and Fiscal Officer vacancies are filled through appointment by the remaining trustees.

For 2019, the elected officials (and end of term) are:
 Dennis Schertzer (2021), Trustee
 Beth Marshall (2021), Trustee
 Scott Weeks (2023), Trustee
 Tina Marshall (2023), Fiscal Officer

References

External links
County website
Logan-Union-Champaign Regional Planning Commission website

Townships in Union County, Ohio
Townships in Ohio